Marand railway station (Persian:ايستگاه راه آهن مرند, Istgah-e Rah Ahan-e Marand) is located in Marand, East Azerbaijan Province. The station is owned by IRI Railway.

References

External links

Railway stations in Iran